Gleina is a municipality in the Burgenlandkreis district, in Saxony-Anhalt, Germany. Since 2009 it has included Baumersroda and Ebersroda.

References

Burgenlandkreis